Lynn Dalby (born 17 February 1947) is an English actress.

Dalby was born in Harrogate, West Riding of Yorkshire, England.

Career

She trained at the Corona Theatre School with future Emmerdale co-star Frazer Hines.  

Her first TV appearance in 1964 was in Crossroads as a secretary called Rita Hughes. In 1969 she took part in the TV comedy series, again playing under the name Rita, called The Gnomes of Dulwich alongside actors Hugh Lloyd and Terry Scott.

In 1971 she became popular as Budgie's (played by actor Adam Faith) girlfriend Hazel Fletcher in the weekly TV series Budgie, where she became one of the regular characters. Between 1971 and 1972, 26 episodes of the series were made. 

She played Ruth Merrick Sugden in the soap opera Emmerdale Farm in 1972. 

She acted in the 1975 horror film Legend of the Werewolf where she played the part of Christine. She played Marie De La Garde alongside Ian Ogilvy in an episode of the TV series Return of the Saint called The Diplomat's Daughter aired on 11 March, 1979.

In 1980 she starred in the TV crime drama Breakaway, playing the part of Jo Hathaway, written by Francis Durbridge. 

Dalby has made several appearances on television, from the 1980s up until 2001. She emigrated to Australia in 1987 to take part in several Australian TV series including Sons and Daughters, Water Rats, All Saints and Always Greener.

Personal life
Dalby married Ray Lonnen in 1977 with whom she had three children. They divorced in 1983.  

She emigrated to Australia to continue her career in acting and retired there.

External links

1947 births
Living people
English television actresses
Actors from Harrogate
20th-century English actresses
Actresses from Yorkshire
English emigrants to Australia